Michael Hartley (born 14 July 1952) is a British former ultramarathon runner.

He won the Fellsman in 1984, 1987, 1989 and 1990 and was also the first finisher in some of the LDWA’s hundred mile events, including the White Peak Hundred in 1988 which he completed in 17:58.

In 1989, he finished second in the West Highland Way Race in a time of 15:32.

Hartley set fastest known times for running several long-distance footpaths in the UK. In 1988, he completed the Southern Upland Way, around 212 miles, in 55:55 which stood until 2020 when it was beaten by Jack Scott. In 1989, Hartley set records for the Dales Way with a time of 13:34 (later beaten by Dennis Beresford) and the Staffordshire Way with a time of 16:10.

In July 1989, Hartley completed the Pennine Way in a record time of 2 days, 17 hours and 20 minutes. He ran the Way, approximately 268 miles, in the north to south direction, from Kirk Yetholm to Edale. He did not schedule any time for sleep during the run, and none was taken. His time took approximately four-and-a-half hours off the previous best which had been set by Mike Cudahy. For his Pennine Way run, Hartley received awards for performance of the year from both the Fell Runners Association and the Bob Graham Club. The record stood until 2020 when John Kelly reduced the time by thirty-four minutes.

In 1990, Hartley ran the three main British twenty-four hour mountain challenges (Ramsay's Round, the Bob Graham Round, and the Paddy Buckley Round) one after the other, completing them in a total time of 3 days, 14 hours and 20 minutes including travelling time between the routes.

Hartley broke another of Mike Cudahy's records in 1991, when he ran Wainwright's Coast to Coast route in 39:36. This remained the fastest time  until 2021 when Damian Hall completed the route in 39:18.

Later in his running career, Hartley was more prominent in road and track races. He finished third at the London to Brighton in 1992 and was victorious at the Barry 40 mile track race in 1992 and 1993, his time in the latter year being 4:00:20.

He represented Great Britain at the 100k European Championships, finishing in fourth place in the 1993 edition. His time in that race of 6:37:45 is, as of 2021, fifth on the British all-time road rankings for the distance. He also represented his country at the global level at the 100k distance in the 1993 and 1995 World Championships.

References

Living people
1952 births
English male long-distance runners
British ultramarathon runners
British fell runners